William Everett Albans (December 23, 1925 – January 15, 1990) was an American athlete. He competed in the men's triple jump at the 1948 Summer Olympics. He was also in USA's squad for the 1952 Summer Olympics. Albans was also a strong sprinter; his personal best for 100 yards was 9.5. He also played rugby league for USA in the 1953 American All Stars tour of Australia and New Zealand.

References

External links
 

1925 births
1990 deaths
Athletes (track and field) at the 1948 Summer Olympics
American male triple jumpers
Olympic track and field athletes of the United States